Diego Mariscal Abascal (2 December 1925 – 11 June 2005) was a Mexican diver. He competed in two events at the 1948 Summer Olympics. His brothers are Olympians Alonso Mariscal, Antonio Mariscal, and Federico Mariscal.

References

External links
 

1925 births
2005 deaths
Mexican male divers
Olympic divers of Mexico
Divers at the 1948 Summer Olympics
Divers from Mexico City